Leo II (or Leon II) may refer to:

People
Leo II (emperor), Byzantine emperor who reigned from January 18 to November 17, 474
Pope Leo II, pope from August 682 to July 683
Leon II of Abkhazia (767/68–811/12)
 Leo II  (1150–1219), King of Armenia, sometimes referred to as Leo I, King of Armenia or Levon I of Armenia, initially known as Prince Leo II
Leo II, King of Armenia (1236–1289), sometimes also referred to as Leo III
Leo II of Halych (d. 1323)

Other
Leo II (dwarf galaxy), a dwarf galaxy discovered in 1950
LEO II (computer), an early commercial programmable computer
Leo II (theorem prover), an automated theorem prover
 Leopard 2, a German battle tank

tr:II. Leo